Detective Inspector William Edward "Jack" Frost, GC QPM, is a fictional detective created by R. D. Wingfield—characterised as sloppy, untidy, hopeless with paperwork—but unmatched at solving mysteries. The character has appeared in two radio plays, ten published novels, and a TV series spanning 42 episodes between 1992 and 2010.

"Jack" is a nickname, alluding to Jack Frost.

Radio plays
The character first appeared in a radio play entitled Three Days of Frost first transmitted on BBC Radio 4 on 12 February 1977, which is a re-telling of Wingfield's "Frost at Christmas" (the novel had yet to be published). He was portrayed by Leslie Sands. The character's second appearance was also on BBC Radio 4, in a play entitled A Touch of Frost, also based on Wingfield's second novel of the same name, transmitted on 6 February 1982. In the second radio play the character was portrayed by Derek Martin.

Novels
Wingfield published six novels about DI Frost, starting with Frost at Christmas in 1984.

Between 2011 and 2017, four Frost books were published under the name James Henry, with the approval of the Estate of R.D. Wingfield. In the case of First Frost, this pseudonym refers to James Gurbutt and Henry Sutton, but in Fatal Frost, Morning Frost and Frost at Midnight it refers to Gurbutt only. These are all prequels to the Wingfield novels. The first three books are set between 1981 and November 1982 when Frost was a Detective Sergeant, and Frost at Midnight is set in August 1983, when Frost is a Detective Inspector. The two latest--and so far last--Frost books are by Denny Miller.

 Frost at Christmas (1984 / 1995, Bantam Crimeline, New York),  (U.S. mass market paperback edition)
 A Touch of Frost (1987 / 1995 Bantam Crimeline, New York),  (U.S. mass market paperback edition)
 Night Frost (1992, Constable, London / 1995, Bantam Crimeline, New York),  (U.S. mass market paperback edition)
 Hard Frost (1995 UK & U.S.)  (U.S. mass market paperback edition)
 Winter Frost (1999, Constable, London / 2000 Corgi Books, London)  (Corgi Books paperback)
 A Killing Frost (2008, Bantam Press / Corgi Books, London)  (Corgi Books paperback)
 First Frost (2011, Transworld Publishers Ltd / Corgi Books, London)  (Corgi Books paperback)
 Fatal Frost (2012, Bantam Press / Corgi Books, London)  (Bantam Press hardback)  (Corgi Books paperback)
 Morning Frost (2013, Bantam Press / 2014, Corgi Books, London)  (Corgi Books paperback)
 Frost At Midnight (2017, Bantam Press / 2018 Corgi Books, London)  (Corgi Books paperback)
 A Lethal Frost (2018, Bantam Press / 2018 Corgi Books, London)  (Corgi Books paperback)
 The Murder Map (2019, Corgi Books, London)  (paperback original)

Television series
Beginning in 1992, television adaptations of the novels, and further stories based on the characters were transmitted on ITV in the UK. The series starred David Jason as Frost. This series was broadcast under the umbrella title A Touch of Frost. There were thirty-eight stories broadcast (forty-two episodes, if counted individually). These have been released on VHS and DVD internationally.

Three endings were filmed for the final episode. The first ending saw Frost the victim of a hit-and-run on his wedding day, and later suffering a fatal heart attack in hospital. The second ending saw his colleague George Toolan die instead, as a result of the car crash. The third was similar to the second with Superintendent Mullet being the victim. The second ending was the one officially used (with David Jason's support). The ending in which Frost dies was screened during a tribute to the show on ITV1 on 6 April 2010.

References

External links
 Fan page about the radio plays of R. D. Wingfield, by Alison and Nigel Deacon.

Fictional British police detectives
Fictional English people